The Kulung Rai also call Kulunge Rai/Rodu are one of the major subgroup of Rai people and indigenous communities of Nepal, as well as parts of northeastern Sikkim and Darjeeling district of India, having their own Kulung language, culture, history and tradition. The Kulung population in Nepal is estimated to be in the region of 150,000-200,000.

The ethno-linguistic region inhabited by the Kulungs is called the "Mahakulung" ("Greater Kulung") and is located in the Solukhumbu District of Koshi Province of Nepal. It specifically refers to the Hongu valley, comprising Gudel, Chheskam, Bung, Pawai and Sotang, as well as villages in the Sankhuwasawa District and the valleys of the Hongu, Sangkhuwa and Sisuwa rivers. Presently Mahakulung is located in the Bung, Chheskam, Gudel and Sotang village development committees in the Solukhumbu District in the eastern part of Nepal. There are Kulung communities in 22 districts of Nepal. However, the major settlements are Solukhumbu, Sankhuwasabha, Bhojpur, Khotang, Sunsari, Morang, Jhapa, Illam, Tehrathum and Kathmandu.

They are part of Kirat community, tracing their lineage from the Kirati ruler Khambu. First time in the hunting era four Kitanti ancestors namely Khapdulu, Ratapkhu, Chhemsi and Tamsi had entered Mahakulung through Rawakhola of Khotang. They liked those places and so Ratapkhu inhabited in Sotang, Khapdulu, Tamsi and Chhemsi created Pelmang, Chheskam and Chhemsi villages respectively. Recently generations of those four Kiranti ancestors are known as Kulung and those large area they have been occupying in Solukhumbu are called Mahakulung. With the beginning of modern era, they started to go out from their territory to search better life. In this regards some migrated Sikkim and Darjeeling of India and some in different parts of Nepal. In World War I and World War II, some Kulung youth were admitted into the British Army and then they migrated in more developed cities such as Dharan, Jhapa and Ilam of Nepal.

The Kulung practise exogamous clan marriage. As per their traditional laws, they are not allowed to marriage within 5 generations of their mother and 7 generations of their father, meaning suppose generation of two brothers now can get marriage after 7 generation of their father and 5 generation of their mother. In this situation they have to create next sub clan form their main clan is called "Phomchim" in Kulung language.

The Kulung community is one of the most marginalized ethnic groups in the country. As they reside in remote hilly areas, basic infrastructure and services, like drivable roads, electricity, clean drinking water, education, communication and health services are lacking.

The majority of Kulungs are dependent on traditional agriculture, cultivating millet and maize; they are also hunters and fishermen. Due to unproductive land conditions, they are not able to produce adequate food from their farms. They are compelled to migrate in search of potering and agricultural work for their livelihood.

They practice traditional religion Kirati and Buddhism. Unlike most Hindus and Buddhists in Nepal, the Kulung bury their dead instead of cremating them.

References

External links
https://web.archive.org/web/20130101123632/http://www.himalayanlanguages.org/languages/kulung
https://web.archive.org/web/20121224133117/http://oiyp.oxfam.org.au/blog/indigenous/a-story-of-a-distinct-himalayan-kulung-people

Indigenous peoples of South Asia
Indigenous peoples of Nepal
Kulung